Wine or Wines is a surname. Notable people with the surname include:

Bobby Wine (born 1938), American baseball player, coach and manager; father of Robbie
Bobi Wine, Ugandan politician
Jeffrey Wine, American biologist, professor
Ollie Wines (born 1994), Australian Rules Football player
Robbie Wine (born 1962), American baseball player and coach; son of Bobby
Sherwin Wine (1928–2007), American rabbi
Toni Wine (born 1947), American songwriter